Meloisey is a commune in the Côte-d'Or department in eastern France.

Meloisey is a village of the Hautes Côtes de Beaune wine region, close to Beaune.

Population

See also
French wine
Burgundy wine
Communes of the Côte-d'Or department

References

External links

 Châteaux in and around the town of Beaune

Communes of Côte-d'Or